Rhyzobius litura is a species of beetle in family Coccinellidae. It is found in the Palearctic   It is mainly found in Western Europe, especially in the United Kingdom  In the southeast, the area spreads to Bulgaria and Greece. In the East it is partly replaced by the related species Rhyzobius chrysomeloides. 
The species lives in forests on trees and on various herbaceous plants in places where it is protected from wind and weather.

References

Coccinellidae
Beetles described in 1787